The pallid large-footed myotis or Philippine large-footed myotis (Myotis macrotarsus) is a species of vesper bat. It can be found in the following countries: Malaysia and Philippines. It is found in caves and arable land.

References

Mouse-eared bats
Mammals of the Philippines
Taxonomy articles created by Polbot
Mammals described in 1845
Bats of Southeast Asia
Taxa named by George Robert Waterhouse